The 2022–23 season is the 114th in the history of FC Sion and their 15th consecutive season in the top flight. The club are participating in Swiss Super League and Swiss Cup. The season covers the period from 1 July 2022 to 30 June 2023.

Players

First-team squad

Other players under contract

Out on loan

Pre-season and friendlies

Competitions

Overall record

Swiss Super League

League table

Results summary

Results by round

Matches 
The league fixtures were announced on 17 June 2022.

Swiss Cup

References

FC Sion seasons
Sion